Margaret Adela Miriam Carver  DL (née Hall; born 10 July 1964) is an English businesswoman.  She is currently Deputy Chairman of Ofcom, and Chair of The Licoricia of Winchester Appeal. She was Interim Chairman of Ofcom between January 2021 and April 2022, and the first woman Chairman of ITN, leading horseracing organisation the RCA, and the British Board of Film Classification.

Early life
Carver was born in Sutton-on-Hull, Yorkshire and brought up in Beverley, where she attended Beverley High School.  Her father is Dr Ivan Hall, an architectural historian and expert on the architect John Carr of York.  Her mother, Elisabeth Hall, came from a distinguished     Hamburg family and emigrated to the UK in 1938.  She attended St Edmund Hall, Oxford, where she received a MA in Biochemistry.  Her principal interests at school and university were music and sport.  At school she gained a county scholarship to study the flute with David Butt, principal flute at the BBC Symphony Orchestra.  She played in several youth orchestras including the National Youth Wind Orchestra (principal flute), the Anglo-German Youth Orchestra and the Oxford University Orchestra.  In 1986 she studied the flute at the Paris Conservatoire Superieure de Musique, and subsequently gained an ARCM from the Royal College of Music in that instrument. She set up a professional wind quintet “Heirs and Graces”. She was a keen sportswoman, representing her school, county and Oxford University. While at school she trained with Olympic long-jumper, Sue Hearnshaw at the Hull Spartan Athletics Club.

Career
After leaving St Edmund Hall, on the advice of her mentor, Lord Moser, Carver began working for SG Warburg, firstly in the Banking Division, then as an analyst at SG Warburg Securities in Tokyo, and subsequently in Corporate Finance.  After leaving SG Warburg, she worked for Clive Hollick, Baron Hollick, Chief Executive of MAI plc (now UBM plc)  in corporate affairs, during which time she helped establish and was on the executive board of Meridian Television, and joined the boards of Satellite Information Services (SIS), and Avenir Havas Media SA.  She then worked as CEO of Three on Four Ltd, a company producing sports and music outside broadcasting including Sky football and Channel 4 Racing.  Since then she has served as a non-executive director on the boards of Sporting Index (Holdings) plc, Link Licensing Limited, Channel Five, SDN Limited,  RDF Media Group plc, British Waterways, the Eden Project, Services Sound and Vision Corporation and the Horserace Betting Levy Board, and the British Horseracing Authority.  Between 2006 and 2017 she was joint owner and director of Carver Care and Mobility, an online and retail mobility specialist.  She has served as Chairman of the British Board of Film Classification (BBFC) Racetech, ITN and the RCA.  

Carver was appointed Commander of the Order of the British Empire (CBE) in the 2021 New Year Honours for services to sport and the media sector and a Deputy Lieutenant of Hampshire (DL) in September 2022.

Other appointments
Carver has served on the Advisory Council of the Rehearsal Orchestra, and governor of the Colville Nursery School in North Kensington.

Family
Married to William Carver, whom she met at St Edmund Hall, Oxford, she has two children.

References

External links
 The Racecourse Association

1964 births
Living people
Alumni of St Edmund Hall, Oxford 
British chief executives
Women corporate executives
Commanders of the Order of the British Empire